Pavol Šoral (18 January 1903 – 29 August 1977) was a former Slovak footballer who played for club side ŠK Slovan Bratislava.

He was the first Slovak player to represent the Czechoslovakia national football team. He played club football for Slovan and his career ended following a leg injury in 1934.

External links

1903 births
1977 deaths
Slovak footballers
Czechoslovak footballers
Czechoslovakia international footballers
ŠK Slovan Bratislava players
Association footballers not categorized by position